The University Hospital Center of São João (in Portuguese Centro Hospitalar Universitário de São João, abbreviated CHUSJ), or simply São João Hospital, is the main hospital of the city of Porto, Portugal, and also the Porto metropolitan area and the North of Portugal. It's also a medical school, the Faculty of Medicine of the University of Porto.

São João is the Portuguese name for John the Baptist.

The São João Hospital gives direct assistance to the population of the parishes of Bonfim, Paranhos, Campanhã e Aldoar, the councils of Maia and Valongo. It also serves as the main reference center for the districts of Porto (except Baião, Amarante and Marco de Canaveses), Braga and Viana do Castelo. It is the biggest hospital of the North of Portugal, and one of the biggest in the country.

History
In 1825 the king D. João VI created the Surgery Royal School of Porto. In 1883 changed to the name for Medical-Surgery School of Porto, with facilities next to Santo António Hospital. In 1911 the Faculty of Medicine of the University of Porto (abbreviated FMUP) on the Medical-Surgery School of Porto.

On 28 May 1926, a coup d'état gave way to Estado Novo (Portugal) in 1933. A long process starts to build two big university hospitals, one in the country capital Lisbon (Santa Maria Hospital) and the other in the capital of the north of Portugal, the second biggest city, Porto.

The building of the São João Hospital was officially inaugurated on 24 July 1959 (Festa de São João do Porto), by president Américo Tomás. Projected as a university hospital, it rapidly became a national reference, at the level of teaching and medical investigation, and also as hospital assistance to the population. All the faculty of medicine also moved to the building. The old building was used by other medical school Abel Salazar Biomedical Sciences Institute.

The installing committee was directed by Hernâni Monteiro, anatomist and professor of the Faculty of Medicine, who had the honor of giving the first lecture on 9 November 1959.}

In 1984 the São João Hospital was made honor member of the Merit Order.

References

See also 
Official website
Doctor Hernâni Monteiro - Sigarra

Hospitals in Portugal
Hospitals in Porto
University of Porto